Merkur Spiel-Arena/Messe Nord station is a surface-level rapid transit station in the city of Düsseldorf, in North Rhine-Westphalia, Germany. It is part of the Düsseldorf Stadtbahn network and serves the Merkur Spiel-Arena.

Services
 the following services stop at Merkur Spiel-Arena/Messe Nord:

 : service every 10 minutes to Düsseldorf Hauptbahnhof.

References

External links
 

Düsseldorf VRR stations